Sarakan is the brand name for a range of oral health products owned by G.R Lane Health Products Ltd. 
 
Sarakan oral health products contain the natural ingredient Salvadora Persica which is more commonly known as the toothbrush tree. It has been used for centuries in the Indian subcontinent  in the form of a chewing stick as a natural way to help keep teeth and gums healthy. The Sarakan range of products offers the benefits of Salavdora Persica in a user friendly format.
 
Sarakan Toothpaste is vegan, fluoride-free and is flavoured with oil of peppermint, clove and geranium. It contains no sugars or artificial colours and does not contain Sodium Lauryl Sulphate (SLS).
 
Sarakan Mouthwash is an alcohol-free anti-plaque mouth rinse which contains the same natural oil flavourings as the toothpaste, and an anti-plaque bacterial agent to get rid of micro-organisms in the mouth and help promote better gum health.

The history of the Sarakan brand
Sarakan toothpaste was developed after a British Army doctor who was serving in India noticed that his patients’ teeth and gum health were comparatively very good despite the general low quality of nutrition. He discovered that many used a "chewing stick" to clean and massage their teeth and gums. These small portions of twig came from a specific shrub, Salvadora persica (the toothbrush tree), which is widespread throughout the Middle East, Africa and Asia. The doctor, on his return to the UK, decided to develop a toothpaste suitable for the European market with extract of Salvadora persica.

External links
Sarakan 
Spa
Mouth Ninja

Oral hygiene